Rolf Wacha (born 23 June 1981) is a German international rugby union player, playing for the SC 1880 Frankfurt in the Rugby-Bundesliga and the German national rugby union team.

He plays rugby since 1999.

He made his debut for Germany in a friendly against Switzerland on 29 September 2007.

Wacha, together with Daniel Preussner, has been in the line-up of the German championship final from 2008 to 2011.

Honours

Club
 German rugby union championship
 Champions: 2008, 2009
 Runners up: 2007, 2010
 German rugby union cup
 Winners: 2007, 2009

National team
 European Nations Cup - Division 2
 Champions: 2008

Stats
Rolf Wacha's personal statistics in club and international rugby:

Club

 As of 30 April 2012

National team

European Nations Cup

Friendlies & other competitions

 As of 21 March 2010

References

External links
 Rolf Wacha at scrum.com
   Rolf Wacha at totalrugby.de

1981 births
Living people
German rugby union players
Germany international rugby union players
SC 1880 Frankfurt players
Rugby union locks